Rainer Basedow (20 May 1938 – 15 May 2022) was a German film, television, and voice  actor. He is known for having provided the voice of Pumbaa in the German dub of the Lion King franchise, up until his replacement with Jürgen Kluckert in The Lion Guard. He also dubbed John Belushi as Jake Blues in The Blues Brothers and Ron Donachie as Sergeant Harley in The Jungle Book.

Biography
Born in Mühlhausen, Saxony (now Thuringia), Basedow graduated from high school in Magdeburg in 1956. As he was not allowed to study in East Germany due to "political unreliability", he fled to West Germany in 1956. He went then for a half year to an acting school in Munich. In 1961, he found his first leading role in the Beckett play Waiting for Godot in a small theatre at the Siegestor. From 1962, he played at the Münchner Volkstheater.

In 1968, he played a police officer in the cult film Go for It, Baby. Basedow played the Sergeant Dimpfelmoser in the 1974 children's film Der Räuber Hotzenplotz, based on the fictional character The Robber Hotzenplotz, at the side of Gert Fröbe and Josef Meinrad. Basedow's Dimpfelmoser had a lasting impact on the portrayal of this character, for example on puppet stages. From 1976 to 1995, he was a permanent member of the Münchner Lach- und Schießgesellschaft. Dieter Hildebrandt's television cabaret Scheibenwischer hired him for several editions. Basedow was seen on television in Derrick, Tatort, Der Alte, Der Bulle von Tölz and Küstenwache.

He was married to Mathilde, whom he met on a set, since 1971. The couple had four children.

Death
Basedow died on 15 May 2022 in Salzburg, at the age of 83.

Selected filmography
Source:

  (1967)
 Trace of a Girl (1967)
 Hot Pavements of Cologne (1967)
  (1968)
  (1968)
 Go for It, Baby (1968)
 Death and Diamonds (1968)
  (1968)
  (1969)
 Angels of the Street (1969)
 Why Did I Ever Say Yes Twice? (1969)
  (1969)
 Love, Vampire Style (1970)
 When the Mad Aunts Arrive (1970)
 When You're With Me (1970)
 Aunt Trude from Buxtehude (1971)
 Tiger Gang (1971)
 Ore di terrore / Kreuzfahrt des Grauens (1971)
 Four Times That Night (1971)
My Daughter, Your Daughter (1972)
 The Stuff That Dreams Are Made Of (1972)
 Three Men in the Snow (1974)
  (1974)
 Lina Braake (1975)
 The Clown (1976)
 Caipiranha (1998)

Citations

General and cited references

External links
 
 

1938 births
2022 deaths
German male film actors
German male television actors
20th-century German male actors
21st-century German male actors
German male voice actors
People from Mühlhausen